Gnome Alone is a 2017 computer-animated fantasy comedy film directed by Peter Lepeniotis and written by Michael Schwartz and Zina Zaflow, from a story by Robert Moreland. The film was first released in November 2017 in Cyprus, Greece, Romania, and Israel. The film received mixed reviews. Produced by Vanguard Animation and 3QU Media, the film stars the voices of Becky G, Josh Peck, Olivia Holt, George Lopez, Patrick Stump, and David Koechner. It follows a young girl who moves to Tenderville, suddenly pairing up with a group of gnomes and her awkward neighbor in an attempt to defeat a pack of rabid and hungry beasts called Troggs.

Plot 
Chloe and her estranged mother, Catherine, move to Tenderville, in a massive house surrounded by mysterious gnomes. One night during dinner, Chloe discovers a secret room that holding a mystical green gem, which she takes and turns into a necklace. Unbeknownst to her, she opens a portal from another realm opens up in her basement, unleashing a pack of rabid and hungry creatures named "Troggs". At her new school, Chloe befriends popular girl Brittany and her friends, Tiffany and Chelsea, collectively known as the BTCs. Chloe catches Brittany's attention with the necklace and she gives it to Brittany in hopes of entering her clique. At home, Chloe encounters a Trogg and attempts to kill it, before it mysteriously blows up.

The next day, Catherine tells Chloe that she will be taking an extra shift at work. Upon leaving, the house gnomes reveal to Chloe that they're alive, and tie up her when they discover she took the Keystone; the mysterious green gem Chloe ended up giving to Brittany. The gnomes reveal that the Keystone keeps the Troggs from causing havoc within their realm. Quicksilver, one of the gnomes, reveals that the Troggs became their mortal enemies after they devoured the botanical lifeforms which made up their way of life. Zook, the gnome's current leader, also explains that Zamfeer, their former leader, once journeyed into the Trogg world to destroy it but never returned. Using the Keystone, they were able to stop the Troggs' portals from opening. They enlist Chloe to fend off the Troggs until she can retrieve the Keystone back. Chloe also inducts her awkward neighbor and classmate Liam to help her out.

Chloe meanwhile, plans to obtain the necklace from Brittany at a school dance, Liam, fearing that Chloe's relationship with the BTCs is detrimental to her social status, splits up with her. When Chloe finds out that Brittany didn't bring the necklace, she comes up with a plan to swing by her house. Liam meanwhile, heads home from the dance and accidentally falls inside a Trogg portal. Realizing Liam's truthfulness, Chloe breaks ties with the BTCs and heads home. After learning of Liam's whereabouts, Chloe regains her confidence and ventures after him through a portal in the toilet. She finds Liam, who gracefully accepts Chloe's apology, and encounter Zamfeer. They uncover a giant crystal and come up with a plan using Chloe's lithium-ion battery from her phone to blow up the crystal up in order to destroy the Trogg world. They blow up the crystal; a larger version of the Keystone, and use the invading Troggs to escape in a portal, sucking all the Troggs back in their realm.

As the gnomes happily reunite with Zamfeer, Brittany arrives to further humiliate Chloe and Liam and destroy the remaining Keystone. While Brittany chastises Chloe, the Gnomes, Chloe, and Liam witness the formation of the Mega Trogg, which escapes from the basement. Blocked from escaping, everyone travels to the roof along with an ooze plant; something the Mega Trogg fears. Using the Keystone, Brittany's phone, and the ooze plant, Chloe creates a makeshift bomb, destroying the Mega Trogg and restoring their reality. Waking up alongside her mom, Chloe assures her mom that she wants to stay, while Brittany confirms that she has no memory of what happened the night before. Chloe discovers the gnomes also survived and she walks alongside Liam, friends once more, to school.

Voice cast
 Becky G as Chloe, a young girl that discovers a group of gnomes living inside her home. 
 Josh Peck as Liam, a nerdy boy.
 Tara Strong as Catherine, Chloe's mother.
 Olivia Holt as Brittany, the most popular girl at Chloe's new school.
 David Koechner as Zamfeer, a gnome that is friends with Chloe and Liam who was trapped in the Trogg world until they saved him.
 Jeff Dunham as Quicksilver, an elderly gnome.
 Patrick Stump as Alpha, Bravo and Charlie, three gnomes that befriend Chloe and Liam.
 Nash Grier as Trey, a boy at Chloe's new school.
 Madison De La Garza as Tiffany and Chelsea, the twin best friends of Brittany.
 George Lopez as Zook, the leader of the gnomes.
 Fred Tatasciore as the Troggs and Mega Trogg, the evil creatures that Chloe and the others confront.

Production 
Production on Gnome Alone began at Cinesite in Montreal. The voice cast includes Becky G, Josh Peck, Olivia Holt, George Lopez, and Patrick Stump, while John H. Williams would be producing the film through his company 3QU Media, which would also be financing the film. On June 28, 2017, it was reported that a newly launched distribution company, Smith Global Media, had acquired distribution rights to the animated film. A teaser trailer was released on July 13.

Release 
The film was originally set for an October 13, 2017 release, but on October 12, 2017, the film was pushed back to March 2, 2018. However, the film was not released on that date. The film was finally released on April 20, 2018 in Latin America, Europe, and Asia. It was later announced to be released on October 19, 2018 via Netflix in the United States.

Reception 
On review aggregator Rotten Tomatoes, Gnome Alone has a 44% score.

References

External links 
 
 

2010s musical comedy films
American children's animated comedy films
American children's animated fantasy films
American children's animated musical films
American computer-animated films
American musical comedy films
Canadian animated feature films
Canadian children's animated films
Canadian musical comedy films
2010s children's fantasy films
Vanguard Animation
2017 films
Films about gnomes
2017 computer-animated films
Films directed by Peter Lepeniotis
2010s American animated films
Animated films about friendship
2017 comedy films
2010s Canadian films